Metaeuchromius lata is a species of moth in the family Crambidae. It is found in Greece.

References

Moths described in 1870
Crambinae
Moths of Europe